

Friedrich Wilhelm Koch (15 January 1879  – 3 November 1961) was a German general during World War II who commanded the XXXXIV corps. He was also a recipient of the Knight's Cross of the Iron Cross.

Awards and decorations

 Knight's Cross of the Iron Cross on 13 October 1941 as General der Infanterie and commander of XXXXIV. Armeekorps

References

Citations

Bibliography

 

1879 births
1961 deaths
German Army generals of World War II
Generals of Infantry (Wehrmacht)
SS-Gruppenführer
German Army personnel of World War I
Recipients of the Knight's Cross of the Iron Cross
Recipients of the clasp to the Iron Cross, 1st class
Military personnel from Mönchengladbach
Recipients of the Hanseatic Cross